Constantin Varga (born 18 September 1964) is a Romanian former footballer who played as a defender.

International career
Constantin Varga played one game in which he scored a goal for Romania in a 1992 friendly against Mexico which ended with a 2–0 victory.

Honours
Politehnica Timișoara
Divizia B: 1986–87, 1988–89
Cupa României Runner-up:  1991–92

References

External links

Living people
Romanian footballers
Romania international footballers
Association football defenders
1964 births
Liga I players
Liga II players
Nemzeti Bajnokság I players
CFR Cluj players
FC Politehnica Timișoara players
Győri ETO FC players
FC Dinamo București players
FC UTA Arad players
SSU Politehnica Timișoara players
CS Unirea Sânnicolau Mare players
Romanian expatriate footballers
Expatriate footballers in Hungary
Expatriate sportspeople in Hungary
Romanian expatriates in Hungary
Romanian expatriate sportspeople in Hungary
Sportspeople from Timișoara